The women's shot put event  at the 1997 IAAF World Indoor Championships was held on March 8.

Medalists

Results

Qualification
Qualification: 18.00 (Q) or at least 12 best performers (q) qualified for the final.

Final

References

Shot put
Shot put at the World Athletics Indoor Championships
1997 in women's athletics